The Rock Springs Masonic Temple is a historic site in Rock Springs, Wyoming, United States. It is located at 218 B Street in Rock Springs, Wyoming, United States. It is a contributing property in  the Downtown Rock Springs Historic District, which was added to the National Register of Historic Places on January 19, 1994.

History of Rock Springs Masonic Temple
Rock Springs Lodge 12, AF&AM, was chartered on December 3, 1889 by the Grand Lodge of Wyoming.  This lodge of Masons initially met in the W. H. Mellor Building at 318 South Front Street, in Rock Springs, Wyoming.  In 1911 a site was obtained for a new Masonic Temple.  Bonds were sold in the amount of $25,000, and work on the building was started.  The Temple was finished in late 1912, and the first meeting of Rock Springs Lodge 12 in their new building was in January 1913.

In 1947 a fire occurred in the Temple.  The damage totaled about $6,000, the entire amount being covered by insurance.

References

External links
 Rock Springs Lodge 12
 Virtual Tour of Temple (Gallery)
 Grand Lodge Of Ancient, Free And Accepted Masons Of Wyoming
 Rock Springs Masonic Temple on Wikimapia

See also
 List of National Historic Landmarks in Wyoming
 National Register of Historic Places listings in Wyoming

Masonic buildings completed in 1912
Masonic buildings in Wyoming
Buildings and structures in Rock Springs, Wyoming
Historic district contributing properties in Wyoming
1912 establishments in Wyoming
National Register of Historic Places in Sweetwater County, Wyoming
Clubhouses on the National Register of Historic Places in Wyoming